"Encore" is a 1983 R&B hit single for popular R&B/soul singer Cheryl Lynn. The song is written and produced by the highly successful Minneapolis funk duo, Jimmy Jam & Terry Lewis. Although the single peaked at #69 on the Hot 100, it was the duo's first number one R&B hit as producers/writers and Lynn's second number one charting R&B single. It is the opening track to her album Preppie. The song was also a popular dance track, reaching number six on the US Dance chart.

Other versions

The following other versions were released

 Encore (Dance Version) - 8:18

Charts

References

Cheryl Lynn songs
1983 songs
1983 singles
Songs written by Jimmy Jam and Terry Lewis
Song recordings produced by Jimmy Jam and Terry Lewis
Columbia Records singles